Anton J. Gillbo (January 1858 – November 17, 1919) was an American politician in the state of Washington. He served in the Washington House of Representatives.  He was elected as a Progressive in 1912, alongside G. J. Langford. He was killed in a car accident in 1919.

References

Members of the Washington House of Representatives
1858 births
1919 deaths
19th-century American politicians
Road incident deaths in Washington (state)